The Iberian pond turtle (Mauremys leprosa), also known as the Mediterranean pond turtle or Mediterranean turtle, is a species of turtle in the family Geoemydidae. The species is endemic to southwestern Europe and northwestern Africa.

Subspecies
Including the nominotypical subspecies, there are two sub-species which are accepted:
M. leprosa leprosa  – Iberian pond turtle
M. leprosa saharica  – Saharan pond turtle

Gallery

Distribution
Mauremys leprosa is native to the western mainland Mediterranean Basin, stretching from the tip of southern France to the northwestern Maghreb (in Morocco, Algeria, Tunisia and Libya). It is most frequent in the southern half of the Iberian Peninsula (Portugal and Spain).

References

Bibliography

Mauremys
Turtles of Africa
Turtles of Europe
Reptiles described in 1812
Taxa named by August Friedrich Schweigger
Taxobox binomials not recognized by IUCN